Bumba Airport  is an airport serving the Congo River port city of Bumba in Mongala Province, Democratic Republic of the Congo.

Airlines and destinations

See also

 Transport in the Democratic Republic of the Congo
 List of airports in the Democratic Republic of the Congo

References

External links
 OpenStreetMap - Bumba Airport
 OurAirports - Bumba Airport
 

Airports in Mongala